Pierluigi Magri (born 14 March 1940 in Brescia) is a retired Italian footballer that played in the role of central midfielder. After playing in Aurora Travagliato youth teams he began his professional career in Serie B with Brescia. After two seasons with them he was loaned to teams in lower series.

Career
1959–1961  Brescia 30 (2) 
1961–1962 →  Varese 22 (?) 
1962–1963 →  Lecce 17 (?) 
1963–1964  Rizzoli Milano 25 (?) 
1964–1969  Marzotto Valdagno  ? (?) 
1969–1972  Alessandria 101 (3)

External links
WLecce.it - Archivio

1940 births
Living people
Italian footballers
Association football midfielders